The tenth series of the BBC family sitcom My Family originally aired between 9 July 2010, and 27 August 2010, with a Christmas special that went to air on 24 December 2010. The series was commissioned following consistent ratings from the previous series. The opening episode, "Wheelie Ben", re-introduces the six main characters, with the addition of regular appearances from Kenzo Harper, played by Tayler Marshall. However, the character of Roger Bailey only made an appearance in the series finale. All episodes from the tenth series are thirty minutes in length, with the exception of the Christmas Special. The series was once again produced by Rude Boy Productions, a company that produces comedies created by Fred Barron. Unlike previous series of the show, which were filmed on a yearly basis, both Series 10 and 11 were filmed back-to-back. For the first time in the show's history, two episodes of the series remained unaired for some time. At the time of release, the DVD of the series contained two episodes that had yet to be broadcast on television. On 17 June 2011, one of these two episodes were aired, and the remaining one aired on 22 July 2011. The series averaged 4.55 million per episode; however, they managed to get over 6.00 million viewers for the Christmas Special.

Episode Information

Notes

References

External links
My Family: Series Ten Episode Guide at official website
My Family: Series Ten Spoiler Guide at official website

2010 British television seasons